Agente X 1-7 operazione Oceano is a 1965  Italian-Spanish  spy film adventure directed by Tanio Boccia.

Plot 
Professor Calvert has invented a revolutionary formula which make it possible to manipulate the oceans. An international criminal organisation intends to use his research to blackmail whole nations. After they've abducted him special agent George Collins must extract Calvert from a fortress.

Cast
Lang Jeffries as George Collins
Aurora de Alba
Rafael Bardem

Gloria Osuna
Wladimiro Tuicovich
Ángel Jordán
Moa Tahi
Joe Kamel
Nando Angelini
Gianni Solaro
Aldo Bonamano
Andrea Scandurra

Biography

References

External links 
 
MyMovies.it

1965 films
1960s Italian-language films
1965 adventure films
Italian spy thriller films
Spanish spy thriller films
1960s spy thriller films
Films directed by Tanio Boccia
Films scored by Piero Umiliani
1960s Italian films